Cyclohexanehexone, also known as hexaketocyclohexane and triquinoyl, is an organic compound with formula , the sixfold ketone of cyclohexane. It is an oxide of carbon (an oxocarbon), a hexamer of carbon monoxide.

The compound is expected to be highly unstable, unlike the cyclohexanehexathione analog, and as of 1999 had only been observed as an ionized fragment during mass spectrometry studies.

Related compounds 

Cyclohexanehexone can be viewed as the neutral counterpart of the rhodizonate anion . The singly charged anion  has been detected in mass spectrometry experiments, formed by oligomerization of carbon monoxide through the formation of molybdenum carbonyls.

According to X-ray diffraction analysis, the reagent traded under the name "cyclohexanehexone octahydrate" or equivalent names is actually dodecahydroxycyclohexane dihydrate—the geminal diol derivative of the six ketone groups with an additional two molecules of water—a solid that decomposes at 95 °C.

Triquinoyl therapy
In the late 1940s, William J. Hale claimed that "triquinoyl", being a trimer of William Frederick Koch's glyoxylide, should be just as effective as the latter against "diabetes, arthritis, poliomyelitis, and even cancer". Even though there is no research supporting this claim (and Koch's glyoxylide preparations were found to be just distilled water), triquinoyl is still listed as an ingredient of some alternative medicine remedies.

See also
 Cyclopentanepentone
 Cyclohexanehexathione, with same structure but with sulfur instead of oxygen.

References

Oxocarbons
Hypothetical chemical compounds
Cyclic ketones
Polyketones
Conjugated ketones